Wilhelm Hasse (24 November 1894 – 21 May 1945) was a general in the Wehrmacht of Nazi Germany during World War II who commanded the 17th Army. He was a recipient of the Knight's Cross of the Iron Cross with Oak Leaves. Hasse died on 21 May 1945 of wounds sustained earlier that month.

Awards and decorations
 Iron Cross (1914)  2nd Class (17 September 1914) & 1st Class (21 April 1915)
 Clasp to the Iron Cross (1939)  2nd Class (11 September 1939) & 1st Class (2 October 1939)
 German Cross in Gold on 26 January 1942 as Oberst im Generalstab (in the General Staff) of AOK 18
 Knight's Cross of the Iron Cross with Oak Leaves
 Knight's Cross on 12 August 1944 as Generalleutnant and commander of 30 Infanterie-Division
Oak Leaves on 14 January 1945 as General der Infanterie and commander of II. Armeekorps

References

Citations

Bibliography

 
 
 

1894 births
1945 deaths
People from Nysa, Poland
People from the Province of Silesia
German Army generals of World War II
Generals of Infantry (Wehrmacht)
German Army personnel of World War I
Recipients of the clasp to the Iron Cross, 1st class
Recipients of the Gold German Cross
Recipients of the Knight's Cross of the Iron Cross with Oak Leaves
Recipients of the Order of the Cross of Liberty, 1st Class
German prisoners of war in World War II held by the Soviet Union
German people who died in Soviet detention
Reichswehr personnel